The 2008 Oceania Athletics Championships was the 9th edition of the Oceania Athletics Championships, organised under the supervision of the Oceania Athletic Association, in Saipan, Northern Mariana Islands in June. Athletes competed at two age categories: Youth (U18) and open senior. New Caledonia competed as part of Oceania for the first time, having competed as a guest nation in past events. The four-day competition took place from 25 to 28 June

Medal table 
In medal table counted only events with 3 or more participants:

Results 
The results were published.

Men

Women

Mixed

References

External links
Final Results: Final Results
 OAA Official website

2008
Athletics in the Northern Mariana Islands
Oceania
Oceania Athletics Championships
2008 in Oceanian sport
International sports competitions hosted by the Northern Mariana Islands
June 2008 sports events in Oceania